Ekow Blankson (16 March 1972 – 3 October 2022) was a Ghanaian actor and the Commercial Manager of GhanaWeb.
He also worked on projects for schools, notable among them was a production from Lords Production of GH Schools, he worked with them on a movie titled Breath Vengeance and was nominated Best Adult Male Role in their awards scheme, the GH Student's Movie Awards.

He died on 3 October 2022, at the age of 50 after a short illness.

Education 
Blankson held a Masters Degree in Fine Arts and a Diploma in Theatre Arts (Drama) from the University of Ghana, Legon. He also had a marketing certificate from Heineken Global Commerce University, Amsterdam.

Career 
Ekow worked with media companies including TV Africa, Media General Ghana Limited and Multimedia Broadcasting Company as Managing Director, Director of Brands and Corporate Communications and General Manager (Luv FM and Nhyira FM) respectively. He featured in and directed some Ghanaian movies. Ekow Blankson, until his demise, worked at GhanaWeb as a Commercial Manager.

Filmography 
 Checkmate
 Borga
 In April
 Black Earth Rising
 Death After Birth
 The Intruder
 Diary of the Black Hustler
 The Saga
 Total Exchange
 A Woman's Desire
 Frozen Emotion
 My Mother's Heart
 Check Mate
 Red Label
 The CEO
 Death After Birth
 The Pool Party
 Rhapsody of Love
 The Secret burden
 Dying of the Light
Breath Vengeance
Savannah
Famous
Illusions
A Woman Scorned
Accra Medic Series
To Have and To Hold Series

Awards 
Golden start award awarded by Great Excellence Movie Awards.

Nominations 
 Best Actor nomination at the African Movie Academy Awards (AMAA).
 Best Supporting Actor nomination at the 2010 Ghana Movie Awards.
 Best Male Actor International nomination at the 2022 NELAS AWARDS UK
Best Adult Male Role GH Student's Movie Awards 2022

References

External links 
 

1972 births
2022 deaths
Ghanaian male film actors
21st-century Ghanaian male actors
University of Ghana alumni